Robert Eugene Sykes (March 15, 1927 – August 4, 2020) was an American football fullback in the National Football League for the Washington Redskins.  He played college football at San Jose State.

Early life and education
Born in Oakland, California, Sykes graduated from St. Aloysius College (now Brother Martin High School) in New Orleans. After high school, Sykes served in the United States Army Air Forces as a private first class during World War II.

Following his military service, Sykes returned to California to enroll at Santa Rosa Junior College, where he played on the football team in 1948 and 1949. He then transferred to San Jose State College (now University), where he played for the San Jose State Spartans football team in 1950 and 1951.

Pro football career
Undrafted in the 1952 NFL draft, Sykes signed with the Washington Redskins as a free agent. In four games with one start at fullback, Sykes had four carries for 10 yards and one reception for five yards.

Post-football life
After retiring from football, Sykes owned a Dodge dealership in Santa Clara, California, Bob Sykes Dodge. Sykes died in Laguna Niguel, California on August 4, 2020 aged 93.

References

1927 births
2020 deaths
Players of American football from Oakland, California
American football fullbacks
San Jose State Spartans football players
Washington Redskins players
Players of American football from New Orleans
Santa Rosa Bear Cubs football players
American automobile salespeople
United States Army Air Forces personnel of World War II
Military personnel from California
United States Army Air Forces soldiers